Anaspides tasmaniae is a species of fresh water crustacean of the family Anaspididae found in Tasmania. It is also known by the common names "mountain shrimp" or "chris' pseudo-mantis". It has been described as a "living fossil". A. tasmaniae lives in tarns and creeks  over 300 metres above sea level, and is found in Lake St Clair and Clarence Lagoon.

References

Syncarida
Crustaceans described in 1892